Cnesteboda facilis is a species of moth of the family Tortricidae first described by Edward Meyrick in 1912. It is found in Assam, India.

The wingspan is 15–17 mm. The forewings are brown reddish, sometimes with a few small scattered blackish dots. The costa is suffused with ferruginous ochreous and spotted with dark fuscous. Generally, there is a more or less indicated narrow irregular rather oblique fascia of light grey broken rings with a few black scales. There is also an oblique series of faint pale rings before the apex. The hindwings are grey, but darker posteriorly and on the veins. Adults have been recorded on wing in June, July and October.

References

Moths described in 1912
Tortricini
Moths of Asia
Taxa named by Edward Meyrick